Kathryn Bryce (born 17 November 1997) is a Scottish cricketer who is the current captain of the Scotland women's cricket team. In December 2020, Bryce was named the ICC Associate Cricketer of the Decade. In June 2021, Bryce became the first cricketer for Scotland, male or female, to make it into the top ten of the ICC Player Rankings. Her sister, Sarah, has also played international cricket for Scotland.

Career
Bryce played for the Scotland women's national cricket team in the 2017 Women's Cricket World Cup Qualifier in February 2017. In April 2018, she was named as the new captain of the Scotland women's team, replacing Abbi Aitken.

In June 2018, she was named as the captain of Scotland for the 2018 ICC Women's World Twenty20 Qualifier tournament. She made her Women's Twenty20 International (WT20I) for Scotland against Uganda in the World Twenty20 Qualifier on 7 July 2018. In July 2018, she was named in the ICC Women's Global Development Squad.

In May 2019, she was named as the captain of Scotland's squad for the 2019 ICC Women's Qualifier Europe tournament in Spain. In August 2019, she was named as the captain of Scotland's squad for the 2019 ICC Women's World Twenty20 Qualifier tournament in Scotland. She was the leading run-scorer in the tournament, with 168 runs in five matches.

In November 2020, Bryce was nominated for the ICC Women's Associate Cricketer of the Decade award, winning the award the following month. In June 2021, Bryce was named the ICC Women's Player of the Month for May 2021 for her performance in the four-match series against Ireland. Bryce was the first Associate woman to be nominated and the first Associate player to win the award.

Bryce has also captained Lightning since 2020, and played for Trent Rockets in The Hundred in 2021. In 2021, she was named as the PCA Rachael Heyhoe Flint Trophy Player of the Year, as the second-highest run-scorer in the competition, with 353 runs including her List A high score of 162.

In January 2022, Bryce was named as the captain of Scotland's team for the 2022 Commonwealth Games Cricket Qualifier tournament in Malaysia. In April 2022, she was bought by the Trent Rockets for the 2022 season of The Hundred.

References

External links
 
 

1997 births
Living people
Scottish women cricketers
Scotland women Twenty20 International cricketers
Cricketers from Edinburgh
Warwickshire women cricketers
Lincolnshire women cricketers
Derbyshire women cricketers
Loughborough Lightning cricketers
The Blaze women's cricketers
Trent Rockets cricketers